ISO 6438:1983, Documentation — African coded character set for bibliographic information interchange, is an ISO standard for an 8-bit character encoding for African languages. Developed separately from the African reference alphabet but apparently based on the same data sets, it has had little use; its forms are retained Unicode.

Character set 

See also
Africa Alphabet
African reference alphabet
Dinka alphabet
Pan-Nigerian alphabet
Standard Alphabet by Lepsius

References

External links
"Coded Character Set for African Languages" (June 15, 1979) 
ISO 6438:1983 "Documentation -- African coded character set for bibliographic information interchange"
"Application for Registration No.216, Extended African Latin alphabet coded character set for bibliographic information interchange" (ISO/IEC JTC 1/SC 2 N 3129; Date: 1998-07-06)
"Status of ISO/TC 46/SC 4 Character Sets Projects" (ISO/IEC JTC 1/SC 2 N 3434; Date: 2000-04-18)

06438
Character sets
Writing systems of Africa